Paidipally Vamshidhar Rao (born 27 July 1979) better known as Vamshi Paidipally is an Indian film director and screenwriter who works primarily in Telugu. He is best known for directing mainstream film works such as Munna (2007), Brindavanam (2010), Yevadu (2014), Oopiri (2016), Maharshi (2019) and Varisu (2023). Vamshi Paidipally has won a National Film Award for Maharshi.

Early life
Vamshi Paidipally was born on 27 July 1979 in Khanapur of Adilabad district, Telangana. His parents, who hail from Bheemaram near Jagtial town own a cinema hall in Khanapur. He did his schooling in Hyderabad Public School and his intermediate from Little Flower Junior College. then, He completed his bachelor's degree in commerce and Master's in Computer Applications from Osmania University and he had worked as a software engineer in Hyderabad.

Career 
Vamshi Paidipally began his film career by working as an assistant film director in film Eeswar (2002). While working for the movie Bhadra (2005) producer Dil Raju offered to produce him a film under his production house. He made his directorial debut with Prabhas-starrer Munna (2009). It was an average venture at the box office. He later directed Brindavanam starring NTR Jr which was a commercial success. It is followed by Yevadu (2014) featuring Ram Charan and Allu Arjun.

His 2016 Telugu-Tamil bilingual film Oopiri/Thozha, an adaptation of the French film The Intouchables (2011) starring Nagarjuna and Karthi was a critical and commercial success. The film won him his Filmfare Award for Best Director – Telugu. In 2019, he collaborated with actor Mahesh Babu for Maharshi. The film won National Film Award for Best Popular Film Providing Wholesome Entertainment.

In September 2021, he was signed to direct Vijay's 66th film produced by Dil Raju titled Varisu.

Personal life
Vamsi Paidipally married Malini in 2007 and the couple has a daughter. They live in Hyderabad.

Filmography 

All films are in Telugu unless otherwise noted.

As actor
Varsham (2004)

References

External links
 
 

Living people
Telugu film directors
Tamil film directors
Businesspeople in software
1979 births
Indian male screenwriters
Filmfare Awards South winners
Telugu screenwriters
21st-century Indian film directors
21st-century Indian engineers
21st-century Indian screenwriters
Engineers from Telangana
Film directors from Telangana
People from Adilabad district
Directors who won the Best Popular Film Providing Wholesome Entertainment National Film Award